{{Infobox basketball club season
|club               = Zamalek
|season             = 2021-22
|chrtitle           = President
|chairman           =  Hussein Labib (Interim)
|manager            =  Vangelis Angelou
|stadium            = The Covered Hall Abdulrahman Fawzi Hall
|league             = Egyptian Basketball Super League
|league result      = Semifinalist (eliminated by Al Ittihad)
|league2            = Egypt Cup
|league2 result     = Third place
|cup1               = BAL
|cup1 result        = [[2022 BAL season|Ongoing]]
|PIR_leader         = 
|pir_n              = 
|pir                = 
|top_scorer         = 
|ppg_n              = 
|ppg                = 
|rebounds_leader    = 
|rpg_n              = 
|rpg                = 
|assists_leader     = 
|apg_n              = 
|apg                = 
|highest attendance =
|lowest attendance  = 
|average attendance = 
|largest win        =
|largest loss       =
| h_body          = ffffff
| h_pattern_b     = _redsides
| h_shorts        = ffffff
| h_pattern_s     = _redsides
| a_body          = 643ba1
| a_pattern_b     = _whitesides
| a_shorts        = 643ba1
| a_pattern_s     = _whitsides
| prevseason         = 2020–21
| nextseason         = 2022–23
}}2021–22 Zamalek SC is a season for Egyptian Basketball Super League, in which Zamalek competes for all tournaments, starting with the Egyptian Super Cup as the holder of the Super League title, and Basketball Africa League, along with the Super League for Basketball, the Associated League and the Egypt Basketball Cup

Rosters
Super League roster
The following was Zamalek's roster for the Egyptian Super League, including youth players.

BAL roster
The following was Zamalek's 13-man roster for the 2022 BAL season.

 Depth chart 

Transactions
In

|}

Out

|}

Competitions
Overview

Elmortabt League
Results summary

Group

Matches

Day (1)

Day (2)

Day (3)

Day (4) 

Day (5) 

Day (6) 

Playoffs
Bracket

Although the Egypt Insurance and Olympi teams tied in the number of wins, the victory of the (U18) team to the Egypt Insurance Club favored the team to rise.
Although the Etisalat and Al Geish Army teams tied in the number of wins, the victory of the (U18) team to the Etisalat Club favored the team to rise.MatchesRound 1/16

Quarter-finals

Positions from 5 to 8
After the loss of Zamalek in the quarter-finals, Zamalek competed for places from 5 to 8
Bracket5-8 MATCH Although the Egypt Insurance and Etisalat teams tied in the number of wins, the victory of the (U18) team to the Egypt Insurance Club favored the team to rise.5-6 MATCH Although the Zamalek and Egypt Insurance teams tied in the number of wins, the victory of the (U18) team to the Zamalek Club favored the team to rise.6-7 MATCH Although the Sporting and Etisalat teams tied in the number of wins, the victory of the (U18) team to the Sporting Club favored the team to rise.
Positions from 5 to 8

Positions 5-6Zamalek finished the league in fifth place out of 16  

Egyptian Basketball Super CupThe Egyptian Basketball Super Cup, an annual tournament held between the Egyptian Super League and Egypt Cup champions, enters Zamalek as the champion of the 2020–21 League, and Al Ittihad as the champion of the Egypt Cup.*NOTS''' In objection from the Zamalek club's board of directors to the unfair decisions against the club, the club decided to enter the Super match with the list of players under twenty years old.

Player statistics

Egyptian Basketball Cup

Bracket

Round 1/16

FIBA Intercontinental Cup

The 2022 FIBA Intercontinental Cup was the 31st edition of the FIBA Intercontinental Cup. The tournament was held in February 2022. The competition will be played in the Hassan Moustafa Sports Hall in Cairo, which marks the first time ever the Intercontinental Cup is played in Africa. In September 2021, the Egyptian Basketball Federation announced that Zamalek, as the defending BAL champions, would play in the FIBA Intercontinental Cup. It was the first time an African team played in the competition. On 19 November 2021, FIBA officially announced the four competing teams.

Egyptian Basketball Super League
System
|Egyptian Basketball Super League is the basic and qualifying league for the BAL Championship. The league consists of three stages:
(1)The preliminary stage: where 1 meets 16, 2 meets 15, and so on in terms of ranking in the Mortabt-League.
(2)The regular league: After the rise of eight teams compete among themselves In back and forth matches.
(3)Playoffs stage: It starts from the final round, where the 1st place holder of the regular league meets the 8th place holder in a series of three matches, then the semi-finals and the final is a series of 5 matches.

The preliminary stage
Zamalek finished fifth in the league associated with it, and it will meet the 12th place holder, the Olympi, in a series of three matches, to ascend the first to win the

Regular season

Matches

Playoffs
Quarterfinals

Semifinals

Basketball Africa League

Group phase

Standings

Games

|-
!colspan=12 style=""|Group phase
|-

|-
!colspan=12 style=""|Playoffs
|-

References

External links
 Official website
 FIBA official website

FIBA
Zamalek SC seasons